Lazzeri is a surname. Notable people with the surname include:

Maria Domenica Lazzeri (1815–1848), Italian mystic
Tony Lazzeri (1903–1946), Italian-American baseball player
Valerio Lazzeri (born 1963), Swiss Roman Catholic bishop

See also
Lazzari

Italian-language surnames